The ADT Championship was a women's professional golf tournament on the U.S.-based LPGA Tour. The season-ending event on the tour, it became the LPGA Playoffs at The ADT from 2006 through 2008.

History
The tournament was played in its final playoff form for the first time in November 2006; the champion of the event, Julieta Granada, won $1 million, the highest first-place prize in the history of women's golf.  The event took place at the Trump International Golf Club in West Palm Beach, Florida.

From 1996 through 2005 the tournament was a standard, 72-hole stroke play event. It had a purse of $1,000,000 in its final season, with a winner's share of $215,000.

The playoff event in 2006 was the first time golf has ever used a postseason of any kind on any tour. Beginning in 2007, the PGA Tour also employed a playoff system.

Through the 2008 season, the title sponsor was ADT, a worldwide supplier of electronic security and fire alarm systems, communication systems and integrated building management systems, with headquarters in Boca Raton, Florida.

Successors
On October 16, 2008 it was announced ADT would not extend its sponsorship. Another entirely new tournament, the LPGA Tour Championship, took ADT's place on the LPGA schedule for two years in 2009 and 2010; it was succeeded by the CME Group Titleholders in 2011

Selection process

2008 selection
As in the two previous seasons, the 2008 season was split into two halves, with 15 players from each half qualifying for the ADT Championship using a performance-based points system. In addition, two wild card players were chosen at the end of the regular season; a total of 32 players competed in the ADT Championship.

The first half began with the SBS Open at Turtle Bay and ended with the LPGA Championship. The second half began with the Wegmans LPGA and ended with the Lorena Ochoa Invitational, one week before the Playoffs.

LPGA members qualified for the ADT Championship by accumulating ADT Points during each half of the season or by winning an automatic entry by winning one of 13 designated "winner" events—defined as any event with a purse of at least $2 million—throughout the season. The two wild cards were the top two players from the LPGA Official Money List who were not otherwise qualified after the Lorena Ochoa Invitational: Sun Young Yoo and Christina Kim.

2007 selection
The selection process in the 2007 LPGA regular season was the same as in 2008, with the only differences being:
 The first half ended with the Wegmans LPGA.
 The second half began with the US Women's Open and ended at The Mitchell Company Tournament of Champions, one week before the Playoffs.
 Only 10 "winner" events were held during the season.

More details on selecting competitors for the 2007 Playoffs can be found at: LPGA.com.

2006 selection
The 2006 LPGA campaign was split into two halves. The first half began with the SBS Open at Turtle Bay and ended with the Jamie Farr Owens Corning Classic. The second half began with the Evian Masters and ended with The Mitchell Company Tournament of Champions, one week before the Playoffs. The top 15 points scorers and one wild card from each half qualified for the Playoffs, making for a total of 32 players who will take part in the season-ending event.

Most of the events on 2006 LPGA schedule were "points" events, in which the top twenty finishers were awarded points. In addition, all winners of the LPGA's majors and five limited field events, such as the HSBC Women's World Match Play Championship, automatically qualified for the Playoffs.

Once the first half ended, and the first 16 players were awarded spots in the Playoffs, the point totals from the first half were wiped out, and the second half began with a fresh scoresheet, meaning points did not carry over from half-to-half.

More details on selecting competitors for the 2006 Playoffs can be found at: LPGA.com.

2008 qualifiers

First half qualifiers
  Lorena Ochoa: won the HSBC Women's Champions (also won the Kraft Nabisco Championship, the Ginn Open, and the Sybase Classic)
  Annika Sörenstam: won the Stanford International Pro-Am (also won the Michelob ULTRA Open at Kingsmill)
  Seon Hwa Lee: won the Ginn Tribute Hosted by ANNIKA
  Yani Tseng: won the McDonald's LPGA Championship
  Paula Creamer: 923,742 points
  Jeong Jang: 664,249 points
  Song-Hee Kim: 509,000 points
  Karrie Webb: 505,867 points
  Suzann Pettersen: 484,664 points
  Na Yeon Choi: 464,709 points
  Maria Hjorth: 422,446 points
  Karen Stupples: 378,342 points
  Jee Young Lee: 375,695 points
  Inbee Park: 368,124 points
  Laura Diaz: 367,228 points

Second half qualifiers
  Eun-Hee Ji: won the Wegmans LPGA
  Helen Alfredsson: won the Evian Masters
  Jiyai Shin: won the Women's British Open
  Katherine Hull: won the Canadian Women's Open
  Cristie Kerr: 848,850 points
  Angela Stanford: 764,706 points
  Angela Park: 667,346 points
  In-Kyung Kim: 625,780 points
  Candie Kung: 582,429 points
  Hee-Won Han: 548,572 points
  Ji Young Oh: 469,308 points
  Shanshan Feng: 452,236 points
  Morgan Pressel: 416,137 points
  Meena Lee: 378,254 points
  Nicole Castrale: 365,501 points

Inbee Park, who won the U.S. Women's Open, qualified via first-half points.

Wild cards
  Sun Young Yoo: $674,983
  Christina Kim: $664,598

2007 qualifiers

First half qualifiers
  Morgan Pressel: won the Kraft Nabisco Championship
  Brittany Lincicome: won the Ginn Open
  Suzann Pettersen: won the Michelob ULTRA Open at Kingsmill (also won the LPGA Championship)
  Nicole Castrale: won the Ginn Tribute Hosted by Annika
  Lorena Ochoa: 1,524,404 points
  Paula Creamer: 685,729 points
  Mi Hyun Kim: 647,110 points
  Sarah Lee: 580,948 points
  Stacy Prammanasudh: 552,707 points
  Jee Young Lee: 521,842 points
  Karrie Webb: 407,786 points
  Cristie Kerr: 395,180 points
  Angela Park: 375,519 points
  Juli Inkster: 372,980 points
  Angela Stanford: 367,855 points

Second half qualifiers
  Seon Hwa Lee: won the HSBC Women's World Match Play Championship
  Natalie Gulbis: won the Evian Masters
  Maria Hjorth: 756,904 points
  Jeong Jang: 748,129 points
  Se Ri Pak: 490,656 points
  Christina Kim: 434,742 points
  Ai Miyazato: 427,108 points
  Laura Davies: 354,785 points
  Inbee Park: 349,906 points
  Laura Diaz: 326,537 points
  Annika Sörenstam: 325,940 points
  Sherri Steinhauer: 302,618 points
  Shi Hyun Ahn: 292,816 points
  Reilley Rankin: 281,929 points
  Sophie Gustafson: 264,607 points

The remaining three "winner" events in the second half were won by golfers who had already qualified via first-half points—the U.S. Women's Open by Cristie Kerr, and the Women's British Open and Canadian Women's Open by Lorena Ochoa.

Wild cards
  Catriona Matthew: $504,366
  Meaghan Francella: $499,292

Current format
 Round 1: All 32 players compete in pairs of two.
 Round 2: All 32 players compete, re-paired in pairs of two with those with the highest scores from Round 1 starting earliest and those with the lowest scores starting latest in the day. At the end of the Round 2, the 16 players with the lowest cumulative scores from Rounds 1 and 2 continue to Round 3. The other 16 players are eliminated  from the tournament. In the event of a tie a sudden-death playoff takes place.
 Round 3: The remaining 16 players compete in pairs of two. Scores are wiped clean for all players, however  starting position is determined by the cumulative score from Rounds 1 and 2, with the players with the highest scores starting earliest in the day and the players with the lowest scores starting latest. The eight players with the lowest scores at the end of Round 3 advance to Round 4. If a tie exists, it is settled with a sudden-death playoff.
 Round 4: The remaining eight players compete in pairs of two. The players participate in a live draw where they  pick which time slot they would like to play in with the first pick going to the low score and the final pick going to the high score. The player with the lowest score after Round 4 wins $1 million. As in previous rounds, ties are settled with a sudden-death playoff.

Controversy surrounding $1 million prize
Most players have supported the tournament, though some criticism has been raised. Annika Sörenstam, for example, commented that a player who had a great year, like Sörenstam did in 2005, when she won 10 times, could miss the cut after round three, and not only lose the tournament, but also the title given to the player who tops the LPGA Money List for the year to someone not even in the List's top 10 at the event's start.

Sörenstam, as well as others, have suggested that only half the prize count toward the money list, while the other half be given as a bonus, and not counted on the money list. The LPGA said it would consider this before the 2007 event. No change was made for 2007.

Possible revival of the ADT Championship?

On November 21, 2009, Golf Channel's Randall Mell reported in a blog post that the LPGA was in preliminary discussions to bring back the tournament in 2011.

Winners

LPGA Playoffs at The ADT

The total tournament score is not shown because that does not determine the winner. Championship round score is shown in bold.

ADT Championship
Tournament names through the years: 
 1996–1997: ITT LPGA Tour Championship
 1998: PageNet Tour Championship
 1999: PageNet Championship
 2000: Arch Wireless Championship
 2001: Tyco/ADT Championship
 2002–2005: ADT Championship

Tournament record

References

External links
 Official website
 LPGA official tournament microsite
 LPGA Tour Playoffs 2006
 First half of LPGA Playoffs 2006 comes to a close LPGA Press Release, July 17, 2006

1996 establishments in Nevada
2008 disestablishments in Florida
Former LPGA Tour events
Golf in Florida
Golf in Nevada
Recurring sporting events disestablished in 2008
Recurring sporting events established in 1996